Camilla Speirs (born 23 August 1989 in Dublin) is an Irish equestrian. At the 2012 Summer Olympics she competed in individual eventing and team eventing.  She took up riding at 5, and starting to pursue eventing at the age of 8.  She made her international debut in 2010.

References

External links
 

Irish female equestrians
1989 births
Living people
Olympic equestrians of Ireland
Equestrians at the 2012 Summer Olympics
People educated at The King's Hospital
21st-century Irish women